The Indian egg-eating snake or Indian egg-eater (Elachistodon westermanni) is a rare species of egg-eating snake in the family Colubridae. The species is endemic to the Indian subcontinent. It is also called Westermann's snake, reflecting its scientific name. The snake belongs to the monotypic genus Elachistodon.

Etymology
The specific name, westermanni, is in honor of Dutch zoologist Geraldus Frederick Westermann (1807–1890).

Geographic range
The Indian egg-eating snake is found in Bangladesh, India, and Nepal. Recent discoveries of the species come from Maharashtra, Gujarat, Punjab, Madhya Pradesh, Telangana and Karnataka.

Habitat

Description
E. westermanni is glossy brown to black, with bluish white flecks posteriorly and a middorsal creamy stripe from neck to tail tip. The head is brown with a black arrow mark. The ventrals are white with brown dots. Adults may attain a total length of 78 cm (31 inches), with a tail 11 cm (4¼ inches) long.

Behaviour
The Indian egg-eating snake is a diurnal or nocturnal, terrestrial species that shows remarkable dexterity in scaling vegetation. When provoked, it raises the anterior portion of the body, forming ‘S’ shaped coils as a defensive strategy.

Diet
E. westermanni exclusively feeds on bird eggs that lack embryonic growth. It has special adaptations such as vertebral hypapophyses, projections of the cervical vertebrae, that jut into the oesophagus, are enamel-capped, and help in cracking eggs. The only other snakes that share these egg-eating adaptations are in the genus Dasypeltis found in Africa.

Reproduction
E. westermanni is oviparous.

References

External links
Genus information

Animal Diversity Web

Further reading
Boulenger GA (1890). The Fauna of British India, Including Ceylon and Burma. Reptilia and Batrachia. London: Secretary of State for India in Council. (Taylor and Francis, printers). xviii + 541 pp. (Genus Elachistodon, pp. 362–363; E. westermanni, p. 363).
Günther ACLG (1864). The Reptiles of British India. London: The Ray Society. (Taylor and Francis, printers). xxvii + 452 pp. + Plates I-XXVI. (Elachistodon westermanni, Appendix [p. 444]).
Reinhardt [JT] (1863). "En ny Slægt af Slangenfamilien Rachiodontidæ ". Oversigt over det Kongelige danske Videnskabernes Selskabs Forhandlinger 1863: 198–210. (Elachistodon, new genus, p. 206; E. westermanni, new species, pp. 206–210 + Figures 1–7). (in Danish and Latin).
Sharma RC (2003). Handbook: Indian Snakes. Kolkata: Zoological Survey of India. 292 pp. .
Smith MA (1943). The Fauna of British India, Ceylon and Burma, Including the Whole of the Indo-Chinese Sub-region. Reptilia and Amphibia. Vol. III.—Serpentes. London: Secretary of State for India. (Taylor and Francis, printers). xii + 583 pp. (Genus Elachistodon, p. 404; E. westermanni, pp. 404–405, Figure 132).
Wall F (1913). "A rare Snake Elachistodon westermanni from the Jalpaiguri District". Journal of the Bombay Natural History Society 22 : 400–401. 
Whitaker R, Captain A (2008). Snakes of India: The Field Guide. Chennai: Draco Books. 495 pp. .

Boiga
Snakes of Asia
Reptiles of Bangladesh
Reptiles of India
Reptiles of Nepal
Reptiles described in 1863
Taxa named by Johannes Theodor Reinhardt